Taryn Natalie Marler (born 1 September 1988) is an Australian actress.

Biography
Marler is best known for her role on Blue Water High as Rachel Samuels. She was also in the short film Car Pool as Chrissy Clapton.

Marler met up with her Blue Water High co-stars Sophie Luck, Lesley Anne Mitchell and Gabrielle Scollay in early 2006. Taryn has also taken part in Rove McManus's stand-up comedy show in a 'Benny Hill' style skit, as a nurse in his 2008 tour.

Marler was later cast in series three of H2O: Just Add Water as Sophie Benjamin, a recurring character who is very involved in her brother Will's success as a free diver. She also causes much misfortune to the mermaids and is viewed primarily as a negative character. She also had a brief cameo in series two of H2O: Just Add Water as Julia, a mermaid from 50 years before the main protagonists' time (she replaced Amrita Tarr in this role).

Filmography

External links

1988 births
Australian child actresses
Australian film actresses
Australian television actresses
Living people
Actresses from Brisbane
21st-century Australian actresses